Maria Canins (born 5 July 1949, in La Villa, Alta Badia) is an Italian racing cyclist who twice won and came second three times in the Grande Boucle. She rode for Italy at the 1984 and 1988 Summer Olympics.

Biography
Canins was a cross-country skier from 1969 to 1988. She was Italian champion 15 times and the first Italian to win the Vasaloppet cross-county competition in Sweden and win from 1979 until 1988 10 times the Marcialonga. She was double world champion and double Italian champion in mountain biking. She was married to the cross-country skier and ski mountaineer Bruno Bonaldi., who was a member of the civilian world championship team in the 1975 Trofeo Mezzalama.

Palmarès

Road Cycling

1982
1st  Road Race, National Road Championships
2nd Road Race, World Road Championships

1983 
3rd Road Race, World Road Championships

1984 
1st  Road Race, National Road Championships
1st  Overall Coors Classic
1st Prologue
1st Trofeo Alfredo Binda - Comune di Cittiglio
2nd Overall Tour of Norway
5th Road Race, Olympic Games

1985
1st  Road Race, National Road Championships
1st  Overall Grande Boucle Féminine Internationale
1st Stages 2, 4, 8, 9 & 11
1st  Overall Tour of Norway
1st Stage 5
1st Trofeo Alfredo Binda - Comune di Cittiglio
2nd Road Race, World Road Championships
2nd Super Prestige Pernod

1986
1st  Overall Grande Boucle Féminine Internationale
1st Prologue, Stages 5 & 6, 9, 11 & 13
1st  Overall Tour of Norway
1st Overall Coppa dell'Adriatico
1st Points classification
1st Stage 4
2nd Super Prestige Pernod
8th Vertemate con Minoprio

1987
National Road Championships
1st  Road Race
1st  Time Trial
1st  Overall Tour de l'Aude Cycliste Féminin
2nd Overall Grande Boucle Féminine Internationale
2nd Super Prestige Pernod
3rd Vertemate con Minoprio

1988
1st  Team Time Trial, World Road Championships
National Road Championships
1st  Road Race
1st  Time Trial
1st  Overall Giro d'Italia Femminile
2nd Overall Grande Boucle Féminine Internationale
2nd Overall Tour de l'Aude Cycliste Féminin

1989
National Road Championships
1st  Road Race
1st  Time Trial
1st GP Conad
World Road Championships
2nd Team Time Trial
3rd Road Race
2nd Overall Grande Boucle Féminine Internationale

1990
1st  Time Trial, National Road Championships
1st Overall Tour de la Drôme
1st Prologue, Stages 3 & 4
1st Trofeo Alfredo Binda - Comune di Cittiglio
2nd Overall Giro d'Italia Femminile

1991 
1st Sankt Johann in Tirol 

1992
1st Trofeo Alfredo Binda - Comune di Cittiglio

1993
5th  Trofeo Alfredo Binda - Comune di Cittiglio

1994 
2nd Trofeo Spadaccini Chrono
3rd Villafranca di Forlì Chrono

1995
5th Time Trial, National Road Championships

Cross-country skiing results
All results are sourced from the International Ski Federation (FIS).

World Championships

World Cup

Season standings

Italian Championships
 1971: 1st, Italian women's championships of cross-country skiing, 5 km pursuit
 1977: 2nd, Italian women's championships of cross-country skiing, 10 km
 1979: 2nd, Italian women's championships of cross-country skiing, 10 km
 1980: 1st, Italian women's championships of cross-country skiing, 10 km
 1981:
 1st, Italian women's championships of cross-country skiing, 20 km
 1st, Italian women's championships of cross-country skiing, 10 km
 1st, Italian women's championships of cross-country skiing, 5 km pursuit
 1982:
 1st, Italian women's championships of cross-country skiing, 20 km
 1st, Italian women's championships of cross-country skiing, 10 km
 2nd, Italian women's championships of cross-country skiing, 5 km pursuit
 1983:
 1st, Italian women's championships of cross-country skiing, 20 km
 1st, Italian women's championships of cross-country skiing, 10 km
 1984:
 1st, Italian women's championships of cross-country skiing, 20 km
 1st, Italian women's championships of cross-country skiing, 10 km
 1st, Italian women's championships of cross-country skiing, 5 km pursuit
 1985:
 1st, Italian women's championships of cross-country skiing, 5 km pursuit
 2nd, Italian women's championships of cross-country skiing, 10 km
 3rd, Italian women's championships of cross-country skiing, 20 km
 1986: 3rd, Italian women's championships of cross-country skiing, 20 km
 1988: 3rd, Italian women's championships of cross-country skiing, 5 km pursuit

National titles
Italian Mountain Running Championships
Mountain running: 1982

See also
List of multi-sport athletes

References

External links

1949 births
Living people
Cyclists at the 1984 Summer Olympics
Cyclists at the 1988 Summer Olympics
Italian female cross-country skiers
Italian female cyclists
Italian female mountain runners
Italian mountain bikers
Olympic cyclists of Italy
People from Badia, South Tyrol
UCI Road World Champions (women)
Sportspeople from Südtirol
Cyclists from Trentino-Alto Adige/Südtirol